Floyd Dixon (February 8, 1929 – July 26, 2006) was an American rhythm-and-blues pianist and singer.

Life and career
Dixon was born in Marshall, Texas. Some  sources give his birth name as Jay Riggins, Jr., although Dixon himself stated that Floyd Dixon was his real name and that his parents were Velma and Ford Dixon. Growing up, he was influenced by blues, gospel, jazz and country music. His family moved to Los Angeles, California, in 1942. There Dixon met Charles Brown, who had an influence on his music.

The self-dubbed "Mr. Magnificent", Dixon signed a recording contract with Modern Records in 1949, specializing in jump blues and sexualized songs like "Red Cherries", "Wine Wine Wine", "Too Much Jelly Roll" and "Baby Let's Go Down to the Woods". Both "Dallas Blues" and "Mississippi Blues", credited to the Floyd Dixon Trio, reached the Billboard R&B chart in 1949, as did "Sad Journey Blues", issued by Peacock Records in 1950.

Dixon replaced Charles Brown on piano and vocals in the band Johnny Moore's Three Blazers in 1950, when Brown departed to start a solo career. The group recorded for Aladdin Records and reached the R&B chart with "Telephone Blues" (credited to Floyd Dixon with Johnny Moore's Three Blazers). Staying with the record label, Dixon had a small hit under his own name in 1952 with "Call Operator 210". He switched to Specialty Records in 1952 and to Cat Records, a subsidiary of Atlantic Records in 1954. "Hey Bartender" (later covered by the Blues Brothers) and "Hole in the Wall" were released during this time.

In the 1970s Dixon left the music industry for a quieter life in Texas, though he did occasional tours in the 1970s and 1980s. In 1984 he was commissioned to write "Olympic Blues" for the 1984 Summer Olympics.

In 1993, Dixon received a Pioneer Award from the Rhythm and Blues Foundation. In the mid-1990s, he secured a contract with Alligator Records, releasing the critically acclaimed album Wake Up and Live.

On June 1 and 2, 2006, Dixon hosted a concert with Pinetop Perkins and Henry Gray, celebrating the intergenerational aspect of blues piano. The band was led by Kid Ramos and included Larry Taylor and Richard "Bigfoot" Innes. Kim Wilson, Fred Kaplan (from the Hollywood Blue Flames) and Lynwood Slim also performed. This concert was recorded and released on the DVD Time Brings About a Change by HighJohn Records on March 6, 2013.

Dixon died of kidney failure in Orange County, California, in July 2006, at the age of 77, having suffered from cancer. A public memorial service was held in Grace Chapel, at the Inglewood Park Cemetery.

Discography

Chart singles

LP releases
 Live in Sweden (Great Dame 001), 1975
 Opportunity Blues (Route 66 KIX-1), 1976 (compilation of recordings from 1948 to 1961)
 Rockin' This Joint Tonite: Ace Holder / Kid Thomas / Floyd Dixon Featuring Johnny Guitar Watson (JSP 1002), 1978
 Houston Jump (Route 66 KIX-11), 1979 (compilation of recordings from 1947 to 1960)
 Empty Stocking Blues (Route 66 KIX-27), 1985 (compilation of recordings from 1947 to 1953)

CD releases
 Wake Up and Live! (Alligator 4841), 1996
 Mr. Magnificent Hits Again (HMO 2450), 1999
 Fine! Fine! Thing! (Highjohn 1739), 2005
 Time Brings About a Change...A Floyd Dixon Celebration (Highjohn 5206), 2006

CD compilations
 Marshall Texas Is My Home (Specialty 7011), 1991; also issued on Ace CHD-361, 1993
 Floyd Dixon: His Complete Aladdin Recordings, 2-CD set (Capitol-EMI 36293), 1996
 The Cocktail Combos: Nat King Cole / Charles Brown / Floyd Dixon, 3-CD set (Capitol-EMI 52042), 1997
 Cow Town Blues: The Seminal 1948–1950 Modern Recordings (Ace CHD-740), 2000
 Floyd Dixon: Hey Bartender! His Very Best 1949–1959 (Jasmine JASMCD-3065), 2016
 The Floyd Dixon Singles Collection 1949–1962, 3-CD set (Acrobat ACTRCD-9074), 2018

See also
List of blues musicians
List of jump blues musicians
List of people from Marshall, Texas
List of stage names
List of West Coast blues musicians
West Coast blues

References

External links
Floyd Dixon biography

1929 births
2006 deaths
American blues singers
American blues pianists
American male pianists
People from Marshall, Texas
Texas blues musicians
Imperial Records artists
Modern Records artists
Kent Records artists
Specialty Records artists
Deaths from kidney failure
West Coast blues musicians
20th-century American pianists
20th-century American singers
20th-century American male musicians